Nidus may refer to:

 Nidus (nest), for insects or small animals
 The characteristic lesion in osteoid osteoma
 The centre of a bladder stone
 The material around which an enterolith forms
 The Nidus, a fictional magical object in the television series Into the Labyrinth